João dos Santos de Almeida, also known as Chinho (September 2, 1982 - July 8, 2019) was a former Angolan football player. He has played for the Angolan national team.

Chinho holds the only African title ever achieved by Angola in football as they won the 2001 African Youth Championship in Ethiopia.

Death
In mid-morning, July 8th 2019, Chinho was found shot dead inside his vehicle, at the Sapu neighborhood, in the outskirts of Luanda, shortly after leaving his office where he had just paid monthly wages to his employees. A witness has reportedly seen a motorcycle bumping on the rear side of his vehicle and as he stopped the vehicle and lowered the side window he was shot by the motorcycle's passenger several times at point-blank range and died on the scene.

National team statistics

References

1982 births
2019 deaths
Angolan footballers
Angola international footballers
Association football midfielders